Down Upon the Suwannee River is the fourth live album by the American rock band Little Feat, released in 2003 (see 2003 in music).

Track listing
Disc one
"Introduction" – 0:11
"All That You Dream" (Paul Barrère, Bill Payne) – 7:40
"Spanish Moon" (Lowell George) – 9:55
"Skin It Back" (Barrère) – 5:56
"Big Bang Theory" (Barrère, Shaun Murphy, Payne, Fred Tackett, Bill Wray) – 6:10
"Bed of Roses" (Murphy, Payne) – 4:41
"Cajun Girl" (Martin Kibbee, Payne) – 8:01
"Sailin' Shoes" (George) – 5:49
"Rag Mama Rag" (J. R. Robertson) – 6:43
"Let It Roll" (Barrère, Kibbee, Payne) – 11:36

Disc two
"Lafayette Railroad" (George, Payne) – 4:33
"Dixie Chicken" (George, Fred Martin) – 27:22
"Tripe Face Boogie" (Richie Hayward, Payne) – 5:43
"It Takes a Lot to Laugh, It Takes a Train to Cry" (Bob Dylan) – 8:49
"Oh Atlanta" (Payne) – 5:51
"Willin'" (George) – 6:31
"Fat Man in the Bathtub" (George) – 7:35

Personnel
Paul Barrère – vocals, guitar
Fred Tackett – guitar, mandolin, trumpet, background vocals
Bill Payne – keyboards, vocals
Kenny Gradney – bass, background vocals
Richie Hayward – drums, background vocals
Sam Clayton – percussion, background vocals
Shaun Murphy – vocals, hand percussion

References

Albums produced by Bill Payne
Little Feat live albums
2003 live albums